Richard Bartha (born in Hungary) is an American microbiologist.  He is best known professionally for his seminal discoveries in the field of bacterial pollution control ("bioremediation").

Life
Dr. Bartha and graduate student Ronald Atlas were the first to discover that bacteria are capable of metabolizing petroleum, paving the way for the use of "oil-eating bacteria" to clean up oil spills.  Dr. Bartha also made important discoveries regarding the abilities of bacteria to degrade other pollutants, such as pesticides, polyaromatic hydrocarbons, chlorinated organic compounds, and metals.

Dr. Bartha spent his childhood in Budapest, where he attended University.  During his college years he participated in the 1956 Hungarian Revolution, in which Hungarians took up arms against their communist government and against the occupying forces of the Soviet Union.
When the uprising was quashed by Soviet forces, Dr. Bartha escaped to the Federal Republic of Germany (then known as "West Germany"), where he undertook his doctoral studies.
He earned his Ph.D. from the University of Göttingen in 1961, working in the laboratory of Hans Schlegel. In 1962 Dr. Bartha came to the United States of America to conduct his post-doctoral work at the University of Washington. After his post-doc he taught at Rutgers University in the Department of Biochemistry and Microbiology, from 1964 to 1998.

Dr. Bartha is co-author of the most widely used text on the subject of microbial ecology (written with Ronald Atlas).
Dr. Bartha is currently retired, a naturalized citizen of the United States of America.  His professional reputation is matched by his warm and congenial manner with colleagues.

Works

References

External links
"Richard Bartha", Google Scholar

Hungarian microbiologists
Hungarian emigrants to the United States
Rutgers University faculty
American microbiologists
Year of birth missing (living people)
Living people
Fellows of the American Academy of Microbiology